Ruisseau de la Brasserie (English: Brewery Creek) is a small creek that forms the northern and western shores of Île Hull. It circles the downtown of the Hull sector, of Gatineau, Quebec. It runs from the Ottawa River just west of downtown Hull. Running west of Montcalm Street it turns east north of the highway, running up to Jacques Cartier Park where it rejoins the Ottawa River. Originally it was at the heart of Hull's industrial sector, with a number of factories. This included several breweries, from which it gets its name. In the 1980s the area was refurbished by the National Capital Commission. The former water works on a small island in the creek became the Théâtre de l'Île and the Montcalm Street Bridge was replaced by the ornate Tour Eiffel Bridge. Its pollution removed, it has become a popular location for birders.

References

Landforms of Gatineau
Rivers of Outaouais